Ottrelite is a form of chloritoid.

See also

 List of minerals

References

External links

Manganese(II) minerals
Iron(II) minerals
Magnesium minerals
Aluminium minerals
Nesosilicates